The Rolls-Royce RB.44 Tay was a British turbojet engine of the 1940s, an enlarged version of the Rolls-Royce Nene designed at the request of Pratt & Whitney. It saw no use by British production aircraft but the design was licence built by Pratt & Whitney as the J48, and by Hispano-Suiza as the Verdon.

Two early production examples of the Tay were evaluated during 1950 by the Royal Aircraft Establishment (RAE) at Farnborough Airfield, Hampshire, in a specially modified Vickers Viscount.

Variants
RB.44 TayRolls-Royce development engines only, no production.
Hispano-Suiza Tay 250The Tay built under licence in France.
Hispano-Suiza Tay 250AThe Tay built under licence in France.
Hispano-Suiza Tay 250RThe Tay built under licence in France.
Hispano-Suiza Verdon 350The Tay developed under licence in France.
Hispano-Suiza Verdon 370The Tay developed under licence in France.
Pratt & Whitney J48  The Tay built and developed under licence in the United States.

Applications

Tay
 Vickers 663 Tay Viscount
Verdon
 Dassault Mystère IV

Specifications (Hispano-Suiza Verdon 350)

See also

References

Notes

Bibliography

 
 

Tay
1940s turbojet engines
Centrifugal-flow turbojet engines